M'Bizo is an album by the jazz group the World Saxophone Quartet released by the Canadian Justin Time label. The album features performances by Hamiet Bluiett, John Purcell, Oliver Lake and David Murray, with guests Ronnie Burrage on drums, Mario Canonge and D. D. Jackson on pianos, Mabeleng Moholo on musical bow, Jimane Nelson on organ, and James Lewis and Jaribu Shahid on basses.

Reception

The AllMusic review by Scott Yanow awarded the album 4 stars, stating, "The singers and percussionists add to the party atmosphere which even when remembering the dark days of apartheid, sounds quite hopeful and optimistic. Well worth exploring."

The authors of the Penguin Guide to Jazz Recordings wrote that the album "is the fruit of a trip to South Africa and some very happy musical associations created there," and noted that it is dedicated to Johnny Dyani. They commented: "The three-part 'M'Bizo Suite' occupies the bulk of the record, thought the opening 'Snanapo'... and 'Matsidiso'... are both powerful works."

In a review for All About Jazz, Derrick A. Smith stated: "with M'Bizo, it's as if the WSQ and their South African guests internalized the notions of Unity to the point of complete unity of performance. The entire album, true to jazz and to African music, moves like a conversive dance."

John Murph, writing for Jazz Times, commented: "M'Bizo manages to successfully absorb the multilayers of musical ideas without succumbing to pretensions... It almost goes without saying that all members of the quartet unleash wicked solos and soulful cacophony, but in recent times the funk began to stale, M'Bizo offers a different and potent stank."

Track listing
All compositions by David Murray.

 "Snanapo" - 12:21  
 "M'Bizo Suite: Africa-Europe-Asia" - 7:59  
 "M'Bizo Suite: Sizelapha" - 2:56  
 "M'Bizo Suite: M'Bizo" - 12:37  
 "Matsidiso" - 13:24

Personnel
Hamiet Bluiett — baritone saxophone, bass saxophone, contra-alto clarinet
John Purcell — saxello
Oliver Lake — alto saxophone
David Murray — tenor saxophone, bass clarinet
Ronnie Burrage — drums (on tracks 1 & 5) 
Mario Canonge — piano (on tracks 1 & 5)
D. D. Jackson — piano (on tracks 2, 3 & 4)
James Lewis — bass (on tracks 2, 3 & 4)
Mabeleng Moholo — string bow (on track 1)
Jimane Nelson — organ (on tracks 1 & 5)
Jaribu Shahid — bass (on tracks 1 & 5)

References

1999 albums
World Saxophone Quartet albums
Justin Time Records albums